Hunter × Hunter is an anime television series that aired from 2011 to 2014 based on Yoshihiro Togashi's manga series Hunter × Hunter. The story begins with a young boy named Gon Freecss, who one day discovers that the father who he thought was dead, is in fact alive and well. He learns that his father, Ging, is a legendary "Hunter", an individual who has proven themselves an elite member of humanity. Despite the fact that Ging left his son with his relatives in order to pursue his own dreams, Gon becomes determined to follow in his father's footsteps, pass the rigorous "Hunter Examination", and eventually find his father to become a Hunter in his own right.

This new Hunter × Hunter anime was announced on July 24, 2011. It is a complete reboot of the anime adaptation starting from the beginning of the manga, with no connections to the first anime from 1999. Produced by Nippon TV, VAP, Shueisha and Madhouse, the series is directed by Hiroshi Kōjina, with Atsushi Maekawa and Tsutomu Kamishiro handling series composition, Takahiro Yoshimatsu designing the characters and Yoshihisa Hirano composing the music. Instead of having the old cast reprise their roles for the new adaptation, the series features an entirely new cast to voice the characters. The new series premiered airing weekly on Nippon TV and the nationwide Nippon News Network from October 2, 2011.  The series started to be collected in both DVD and Blu-ray format on January 25, 2012. Viz Media has licensed the anime for a DVD/Blu-ray release in North America with an English dub. On television, the series began airing on Adult Swim's Toonami programming block on April 17, 2016, and ended on June 23, 2019.

The anime series' opening theme is alternated between the song "Departure!" and an alternate version titled "Departure! -Second Version-" both sung by Galneryus' vocalist Masatoshi Ono. Five pieces of music were used as the ending theme; "Just Awake" by the Japanese band Fear, and Loathing in Las Vegas in episodes 1 to 26, "Hunting for Your Dream" by Galneryus in episodes 27 to 58, "Reason" sung by Japanese duo Yuzu in episodes 59 to 75, "Nagareboshi Kirari" also sung by Yuzu from episode 76 to 98, which was originally from the anime film adaptation, Hunter × Hunter: Phantom Rouge, and "Hyōri Ittai" by Yuzu featuring Hyadain from episode 99 to 146, which was also used in the film Hunter × Hunter: The Last Mission. The background music and soundtrack for the series was composed by Yoshihisa Hirano.

Series overview

Episode list

Hunter Exam arc (2011–12)

Heavens Arena arc (2012)

Phantom Troupe arc (2012)

Greed Island arc (2012–13)

Chimera Ant arc (2013–14)

Election arc (2014)

Notes

References

External links
 Hunter × Hunter at Nippon Television
 Hunter x Hunter at Crunchyroll
 
 

Hunter × Hunter (2011)
2011